QIC (Queensland Investment Corporation) is a Government owned investment company owned by the Queensland Government. It was founded on 1 July 1991 pursuant to the Queensland Investment Corporation Act 1991 to serve the long-term investment responsibilities of the Queensland Government. As of 30 September 2008, the organisation converted from a statutory Government owned corporation (GOC) to a company GOC and was renamed QIC Limited (QIC). QIC has now grown into a leading long-term specialist manager in alternatives.

Assets
QIC has investments in both Australia and the United States. Most of its shopping mall investments are through a 49% shareholding in a joint venture with Forest City Enterprises. In 2017, QIC reached an agreement to buy Forest City's interest in six of FC's eleven mall investments and an option to buy four others, excluding Charleston Town Center Mall in Charleston, WV. Forest City's US shopping centre management operation would also transfer to QIC.

Amongst its investments are shareholdings in:

Australian retail
Bathurst City Shopping Centre
Canberra Centre
Castle Mall
Castle Towers
Domain Central
Eastland Shopping Centre
Grand Central Shopping Centre
Logan Hyperdome
Noosa Civic
Robina Town Centre
Watergardens Town Centre
 Pacific Werribee
 Pacific Epping
Westfield Coomera
Westpoint Blacktown
Hinkler Central

United States retail
Antelope Valley Mall
Ballston Common Mall
Galleria at Sunset
Ridge Hill Mall
Shops at Wiregrass
Short Pump Town Center
South Bay Galleria
The Mall at Robinson
The Promenade In Temecula
The Shops at Tanforan
Victoria Gardens
Westchester's Ridge Hill

Office buildings
Nauru House, Melbourne
111 George Street, Brisbane
91 Mary Street, Brisbane

Other
Brisbane Airport (25%)
Hobart Airport (35%)
North Australian Pastoral Company (80%)
Port of Brisbane (27%)
Port of Melbourne
Powerco (58%)
Thames Water (9%)
Powering Australian Renewables Fund (PARF) (40%)
Westlink M7 (25%)
NorthConnex (25%)
Queensland Future Fund
above ground development of Cross River Rail stations

References

Government-owned companies of Queensland
Investment companies of Australia
Australian companies established in 1991